List of consular and (until 1918) diplomatic missions in Hamburg.

History 

Hamburg's history of diplomatic relations with foreign countries started in the 16th century, in that time the city was a free imperial city. The first missions from the city of Hamburg to other countries date back to the Middle Ages and Hamburg's participation in the Hanseatic league. At first representatives were called Oldermänner or by the English term "Courtmaster", later in the style of the common "Consul". As of 2009, there were 100 consulates in Hamburg, ranked the third-largest in the world (after New York City and Hong Kong) and largest in Europe. The consuls are official representatives of the government of a foreign state to the city of Hamburg, normally acting to assist the citizens of the consul's own country, to represent his country's interests, and to facilitate trade and friendship between the people of Hamburg and the country of which he is a representative. There are several consuls providing assistance with bureaucratic issues to both, the citizens of the consul's own country travelling or living abroad, and to Hamburg's citizens (and often Northern Germany, e.g. the Consulate-general of Japan), who wish to trade with the consul's country (e.g. information about visa or customs duties). Consuls are also patrons of fairs or exhibitions, like US Consul General Karen E. Johnson was the patron of the Youth Exchange Fair in September 2009.

In the 19th century Hamburg was an important location for diplomatic missions, because of the prestige gained by the Hanseatic cities and the importance as a centre of commerce. The trade and independent striving of the Hanseatic cities of Bremen, Lübeck and Hamburg for the "common German service" were even named in the Westphalian peace treaty in 1648, and the Hanseatic and later Hamburgian consuls during the 16th, 17th and 18th centuries were also representatives for "all fellow Germans". The Senate of Hamburg often opened a consulate to cities and countries, if a trade post existed, esp. by shipping. There were very few cities like Dresden—then capital of Saxony—without a sea port. Treaties were signed, if a proper unsalaried candidate for the position had been found. Article 23 of the treaty between the Hanseatic cities and Guatemala signed on 25 June 1847 decreed the bilateral deployment of consuls, or article 9 of the treaty with Sardinia ruled the judicial authority of the Hanseatic consuls. Even in the 20th century, the importance of Hamburg is emphasized by the position of the port of Hamburg in the world's ranking. In 2007, it was one of the busiest container ports of the world. In the segment of transshipment Hamburg was in a leading position in 2004. In 2005, the port handled more containers with destination or provenance in Germany as Bremerhaven and Rotterdam combined.

The first mission established, was from Austria (then Habsburg monarchy) in 1570, the Slovak Republic's consulate was the 100th in 2006, and the last one was the consulate of the Palau (as of 2009), former German colony from 1899 until 1918/19. The first missions visiting Hamburg often were trade missions of foreign countries. During the Thirty Years' War (1618–1648) constant diplomatic missions were needed, most of those envoys or residents were Hamburg citizens—only large and most influential states sent own nationals. Some countries sent their missions from 1815 – 1886, at this time Hamburg was an independent and sovereign state of the German Confederation.

List
 
 
Legend

Notes 
<li>^Date of establishment
<li>^Sorted by postal code
<li>^Protocolic rank of the consul in Hamburg, depends on the type of the mission and the term in office. (As of July 2009)

References 

Main

Further reading

External links

 Hamburg website on consulates. . Retrieved on 2009-09-03.

 
History of Hamburg
Diplomatic missions
Hamburg
Hamburg